Sahaptin or Shahaptin, endonym Ichishkin, is one of the two-language Sahaptian branch of the Plateau Penutian family spoken in a section of the northwestern plateau along the Columbia River and its tributaries in southern Washington, northern Oregon, and southwestern Idaho, in the United States; the other language is Nez Perce or Niimi'ipuutímt.

The word Sahaptin/Shahaptin is not the one used by the tribes that speak it, but from the Columbia Salish name, Sħáptənəxw / S-háptinoxw, which means "stranger in the land". This is the name the Wenatchi (in Sahaptin: Winátshapam) and Kawaxchinláma (who speak Columbia Salish) traditionally call the Nez Perce people. Early white explorers mistakenly applied the name to all the various Sahaptin speaking people, as well as to the Nez Perce. Sahaptin is spoken by various tribes of the Washington Reservations; Yakama, Warm Springs, Umatilla; and also spoken in many smaller communities such as Celilo, Oregon.

The Yakama tribal cultural resources program has been promoting the use of the traditional name of the language, Ichishkíin Sɨ́nwit (″this language″), instead of the Salish term Sahaptin.

Tribes and dialects
Sahaptin tribes speak three mutually intelligible dialects:

Northern Sahaptin
Northwest Sahaptin dialects:
Kittitas (Upper Yakama) (autonym: Pshwánapam / Pshwanpawam)
Lower Yakama (Yakama proper) (autonym: Mámachatpam)
Klickitat (Klikatat) (Yakama name: Xwálxwaypam or L'ataxat)
Upper Cowlitz (Cowlitz Klickitat, Lewis River Klickitat Band, autonym: Taidnapam / Táytnapam)
Upper (Mountain) Nisqually (Meshal / Me-Schal / Mashel / Mica'l Band of Nisqually, autonym: Mishalpam, Yakama name: Mical-ɫa'ma) 
Northeast Sahaptin dialects: 
Wanapum (Wánapam)
Walla Walla (Yakama name: Waluulapan)
Palouse (Palus) (Yakama name: Pelúuspem)
Lower Snake River
Chamnapam
Wauyukma
Naxiyampam

Southern Sahaptin (Columbia River dialects): 
Umatilla (Rock Creek Indians, Yakama name: Amatalamlama / Imatalamlama)
Sk'in/Skin-pah (Sawpaw Band, Fall Bridge, Rock Creek people, Yakama name: K'milláma, perhaps another Tenino subtribe)
Tenino (Warm Springs bands)
Tinainu (Tinaynuɫáma) or "Dalles Tenino" (Tenino proper)
Tygh (Taih, Tyigh) or "Upper Deschutes" (divided into: Tayxɫáma (Tygh Valley), Tiɫxniɫáma (Sherar's Bridge), and Mliɫáma (Warm Spring Reservation)
Wyam (Wayámɫáma) or "Lower Deschutes" (Celilo Indians, Yakama name: Wayámpam) 
Dock-Spus (Tukspush) (Takspasɫáma) or "John Day"

Phonology
The charts of consonants and vowels below are used in the Yakima Sahaptin (Ichishkiin) language:

Consonants

Vowels 

Vowels can also be accented (e.g. /á/).

Writing system
This writing system is used for Umatilla Sahaptin.

Grammar
There are published grammars, a recent dictionary, and a corpus of published texts.

Sahaptin has a split ergative syntax, with direct-inverse voicing and several applicative constructions.

The ergative case inflects third-person nominals only when the direct object is first- or second-person (the examples below are from the Umatilla dialect):

The direct-inverse contrast can be elicited with examples such as the following. In the inverse, the transitive direct object is coreferential with the subject in the preceding clause.

The inverse (marked by the verbal prefix pá-) retains its transitive status, and a patient nominal is case marked accusative.

A semantic inverse is also marked by the same verbal prefix pá-.

In Speech Act Participant (SAP) and third-person transitive involvement, direction marking is as follows:

See also
 Sahaptian languages
 Sahaptin people
 Cayuse
 Palus (tribe)
 Umatilla (tribe)
 Walla Walla (tribe)
 Yakama

Notes

References

 Beavert, Virginia, and Sharon Hargus (2010).  Ichishkiin Sɨ́nwit Yakama/Yakima Sahaptin Dictionary.  Toppenish and Seattle: Heritage University and University of Washington Press.
 Hargus, Sharon, and Virginia Beavert. (2002). Yakima Sahaptin clusters and epenthetic [ɨ].  Anthropological Linguistics, 44.1-47.
 Jacobs, Melville (1929).  Northwest Sahaptin Texts, 1.  University of Washington Publications in Anthropology 2:6:175-244.  Seattle: University of Washington Press.
 Jacobs, Melville (1931).  A Sketch of Northern Sahaptin Grammar.  University of Washington Publications in Anthropology 4:2:85-292.  Seattle: University of Washington Press.
 Jacobs, Melville (1934).  Northwest Sahaptin Texts.  English language only.  Columbia University Contributions to Anthropology 19, Part 1.  New York: Columbia University Press.
 Jacobs, Melville (1937).  Northwest Sahaptin Texts.  Sahaptin language only.  Columbia University Contributions to Anthropology 19, Part 2.  New York: Columbia University Press.
 Mithun, Marianne. (1999). The languages of Native North America. Cambridge: Cambridge University Press.  (hbk); .
 Rigsby, Bruce, and Noel Rude. (1996).  Sketch of Sahaptin, a Sahaptian Language.  In Languages, ed. by Ives Goddard, pp. 666–692. Handbook of North American Indians, Volume 17. Washington, D.C.: Smithsonian Institution.
 Rude, Noel. (1988). Pronominal prefixes in Klikitat Sahaptin. In Papers from the 1988 Hokan-Penutian Languages Workshop: Held at the University of Oregon, June 16–18, 1988, compiled by Scott DeLancey, pp. 181–197.  Eugene, Oregon: University of Oregon Papers in Linguistics.
 Rude, Noel. (1994). Direct, inverse and passive in Northwest Sahaptin.  In Voice and Inversion, ed. by T. Givón.  Typological Studies in Language, Vol. 28:101-119.  Amsterdam: John Benjamins.
 Rude, Noel. (2006).  Proto-Sahaptian vocalism. University of British Columbia Working Papers in Linguistics, Volume 18: 264-277.
 Rude, Noel. (2009).  Transitivity in Sahaptin. Northwest Journal of Linguistics, Vol. 3, Issue 3, pp. 1–37.
 Rude, Noel. (2011).  External possession, obviation, and kinship in Umatilla Sahaptin. University of British Columbia Working Papers in Linguistics, Volume 30: 351-365.
 Rude, Noel. (2012).  Reconstructing Proto-Sahaptian Sounds. University of British Columbia Working Papers in Linguistics, Volume 32: 292-324.
 Rude, Noel. (2014). Umatilla Dictionary.  Seattle & London: University of Washington Press.

External links 

ELAR archive of Yakima (Sahaptin) language documentation materials

Yakama Ichishkíin flashcard decks

Sahaptian languages
Indigenous languages of Washington (state)
Indigenous languages of Oregon
Indigenous languages of Idaho